Teyjat is a commune in the Dordogne department in Nouvelle-Aquitaine in southwestern France.

Population

Sights
A late Magdalenian decorated cave is located in the village.

See also
Communes of the Dordogne department

References

Communes of Dordogne
Dordogne